Penrose Wolf Building, also known as the Rockwood Opera House, is a historic commercial building located at Rockwood, Somerset County, Pennsylvania.  The front section was built in 1898, and is a two-story, wood-frame structure measuring 30 feet by 60 feet.  The rear section was added in 1905, and is a three-story, yellow brick structure measuring 50 feet by 75 feet.  In the early 20th century, the upper floor of the wood frame section housed "the Opera House." The rear section was designed for heavy commercial use and housed a grain and lumber storage facility.  In 2000 the building was purchased by Judith Pletcher and restored to working order.  Currently housing shoppes, restaurants and live entertainment in the Opera House.

It was added to the National Register of Historic Places in 2002.

References

Commercial buildings on the National Register of Historic Places in Pennsylvania
Office buildings completed in 1898
Buildings and structures in Somerset County, Pennsylvania
1898 establishments in Pennsylvania
National Register of Historic Places in Somerset County, Pennsylvania